Jancy James was the first Vice Chancellor of Central University of Kerala situated near Kasaragod in the Kerala State of India.  She was born in Vaikam and was also a member of UPSC civil service interview  board.

Earlier she was the Vice Chancellor of Mahatma Gandhi University in Kerala.   She was also the first woman to become the Vice Chancellor of a university in Kerala when she was appointed to Mahatma Gandhi University.

References

External links 
 Official website of Central University of Kerala

Living people
Womanists
20th-century Indian educational theorists
St. Teresa's College alumni
Academic staff of the University of Kerala
People from Kasaragod district
Academic staff of Mahatma Gandhi University, Kerala
Indian women educational theorists
Educators from Kerala
Women educators from Kerala
Year of birth missing (living people)
20th-century women educators
20th-century Indian women